BloodRayne is an action-adventure hack and slash video game developed by Terminal Reality and first released on October 31, 2002. The game has since spawned a franchise with the addition of sequels, films, and self-contained comic books.

A remastered version was released on November 20, 2020 as BloodRayne: Terminal Cut by Terminal Reality and Ziggurat Interactive, and later on PlayStation 4, PlayStation 5, Xbox One, Xbox Series and Nintendo Switch as BloodRayne: ReVamped on November 18, 2021.

Plot
The game begins in 1933, and consists of three acts. In Mortton, Louisiana, Rayne's first mission with the Brimstone Society is to investigate an outbreak of an unidentified disease in the area.

The story skips ahead several years to Argentina. Rayne is sent to infiltrate a Nazi base and prevent the G.G.G. from obtaining the mystic artifact known as "the skull of Beliar" by eliminating the organization's officers.

Rayne finds an anonymous letter informing her that a G.G.G. officer in Germany has list of the remaining G.G.G. officers. After obtaining the list, she pursues her targets to Castle Gaustadt in Germany to eradicate the G.G.G., and eventually, Jurgen Wulf himself.

Characters
 Rayne is a dhampir looking for her father, and kills any vampire that crosses her path. She is working for the Brimstone Society.
 Mynce is Rayne's friend and mentor. She helps her with her first assignment, during which she is seemingly killed.
 Juergen Wulf is the leader of Gegengeist Gruppe (Counter-Ghost Group, abbreviated G.G.G.), a group that aims to bring Hitler into power through use of occult artifacts, including obtaining and reassembling the remains of Beliar.
 Beliar was the original devil, usurped by Mephisto who tore him apart scattering his body parts around the world. These "relics" retain some of his power, granting their owners supernatural abilities.

Development
The game had a development budget of $2 million. The total budget was $6 million to $7 million. Development time was more than two years.

Reception

The PlayStation 2 and Xbox versions of BloodRayne received "generally favorable reviews", while the GameCube and PC versions received "mixed or average reviews", according to the review aggregation website Metacritic. Electronic Gaming Monthly gave the PS2 version 7, 7.5 and 7.5 for a total of 7.33 out of 10. In Japan, where the same console version was ported and published by Electronic Arts on August 26, 2004, Famitsu gave it a score of 29 out of 40.

References

External links
 
 Archived website
 

2002 video games
Action video games
Alternate history video games
Aspyr games
BloodRayne
Cancelled Game Boy Advance games
Cancelled PlayStation Portable games
Dieselpunk
GameCube games
Hack and slash games
MacOS games
Majesco Entertainment games
Video games about Nazis
Nazism in fiction
Nintendo Switch games
PlayStation 2 games
PlayStation 4 games
PlayStation 5 games
Single-player video games
Third-person shooters
Video games about vampires
Video games about Nazi Germany
Video games about zombies
Video games developed in the United States
Video games set in 1933
Video games set in 1938
Video games set in Argentina
Video games set in castles
Video games set in Germany
Video games set in Louisiana
Windows games
Xbox games
Xbox One games
Terminal Reality games
Ziggurat Interactive games